Indian Idol Academy is a music learning program that was launched during the Grand Finale of Indian Idol Junior Season 1 on September, 2013. It is a joint venture of KarmYog Education Network and FreemantleMedia. The program offers a variety of musical courses for both  beginners and experts in the field of music which is delivered through the OmniDEL Campus.

Indian Idol Academy has been launched in 25 cities.

History
FreemantleMedia, the owners of the Idol brand behind the Indian Idol show, developed the platform for talent development together with KarmYog Education Network, a Kolkata based e-learning company.

Courses
Indian Idol Academy offers courses at different levels.

Introductory Workshop: JAAAGO!
JAAAGO! is a musical workshop for children and their parents. It is followed by a digital audition.

Introductory Course: Music Discovery Program
Music Discovery Program is a music education course for beginners, which aims at helping learners to get to know their core area of interest in music.

It is a 1-year program which is divided into 4 levels of certification with main lessons and taleem lessons (practice sessions). Each main lesson has 4 distinct sections: Gyaan, Swarleela, Palta Time and Song Time. Every main lesson is followed by taleem lessons.

Choir Camp for the City Idols
Choir Camp – For the City Idols, is a musical camp conducted by certified music mentors of the Academy.

Music Mentor Certification Program
Music Mentor Certification program is a course designed especially for the music trainers.

Talent Development Program
Talent Development program is an advanced course designed especially for talented learners.

Learning from the Legends
Learning from the legends is a course designed by the Academy to provide direct tutoring for the learners by previous Indian Idol participants.

Pre-Audition Intensive Course
Pre-Audition Intensive Course is designed for grooming and training Indian Idol show aspirants by the certified mentors of the Indian Idol Academy.

Campus

OmniDEL Campus
The OmniDEL campus is a combination of real and virtual spaces for learning.

Web Campus
Web Campus is an internet-based learning environment which provides individual learners with an archive of their lessons. The web campus is also used by the music mentors of Indian Idol Academy to schedule sessions, evaluate performance and assign tasks.

References

External links
 
 http://www.thehindu.com/entertainment/indian-idol-academy-to-be-set-up-in-50-cities/article6369550.ece
 http://timesofindia.indiatimes.com/tv/news/hindi/Indian-Idol-Academy-Officially-Launched-on-the-finale/articleshow/22457260.cms

Indian Idol
Indian music television series